Lectionary 33, designated by siglum ℓ 33 (in the Gregory-Aland numbering), is a Greek manuscript of the New Testament, on parchment leaves. Palaeographically it has been assigned to the 11th-century.

Description 

The codex contains Lessons from the Gospels of John, Matthew, Luke lectionary (Evangelistarium).

The codex was examined by Scholz. A Menologion was edited by Stephanus Ant. Morcelli, Rome 1788. 

The codex was held in Rome. It once belonged to Cardinal Alex. Albani. 

The manuscript is sporadically cited in the critical editions of the Greek New Testament (UBS3).

See also 

 List of New Testament lectionaries
 Biblical manuscript
 Textual criticism

Notes and references

Bibliography 

 

Greek New Testament lectionaries
11th-century biblical manuscripts